The round goby (Neogobius melanostomus) is a fish.  Defined as a euryhaline bottom-dwelling goby of the family Gobiidae, it is native to Central Eurasia, including the Black Sea and the Caspian Sea. Round gobies have established large non-native populations in the Baltic Sea, several major Eurasian rivers, and the North American Great Lakes.

Characteristics
Round gobies are small, soft-bodied fish characterized by a distinctive black spot on the first dorsal fin. The eyes are large and protrude slightly from the top of the head and, like most gobies, the pelvic fins are fused to form a single disc (shaped like a suction cup) on the belly. Male round gobies are larger than females. Juvenile round gobies (less than one year old) are grey. Upon maturation, round gobies become mottled with grey, black, brown, and olive green markings. Adult male round gobies turn inky black during the spawning season and develop swollen cheeks. Male and female round gobies are easily differentiated by the shape of their urogenital papilla, which in males is white to grey and long and pointed and in females is brown, short, and blunt-tipped.

Distribution and habitat
Round gobies are widespread in the Sea of Marmara and in the rivers of its basin and can also be found in the Black Sea and the Sea of Azov, along all coasts and fresh waters of their basins as well as in the coastal lakes and lagoons.  They are also found in the rivers of Crimea and the Caucasus (Mezib, Pshada, Vulan, Kodori, and Çoruh) and in the Caspian Sea, represented by subspecies Neogobius melanostomus affinis.

Since 1990, the round goby has been registered as introduced in the North American Great Lakes, in parts of Europe, and in the Baltic Sea as an invasive species. The first catch in North America was documented by Jude et al 1992 and Crossman et al 1992, caught by an angler in Sarnia, Ontario, fishing the St. Clair River on June 28, 1990. Round gobies are also rapidly expanding into tributaries of the Great Lakes in North America and were recently discovered in at least one of the Finger Lakes in New York State (Cayuga Lake) and the first round goby was discovered by the state of New York in the Hudson River in 2021.

Round gobies are euryhaline (salt-tolerant) and live in both freshwater and marine ecosystems, up to a mineralization of 18–24%.

Feeding
Round gobies actively feed both nocturnally and diurnally and are believed to detect prey only while stationary. The primary diet of round gobies includes mollusks, crustaceans, worms, fish eggs, zebra mussels, small fish, insect larvae, and other small invertebrates (insects and amphipods) living on the bottom of lakes and streams. In spring, the main elements of their diet in the Sasyk Lagoon are Hydrobia, Cerastoderma, and Abra. In the same season, near the Romanian coasts of the Black Sea, the round goby feeds on polychaetes, crustaceans (Idotea balthica, Pachygrapsus marmoratus, Xantho poressa, etc.), and juvenile gobies. Near Sevastopol, the round goby feeds on molluscs (Mytilaster lineatus and Abra sp.).

In the Gulf of Odessa, twenty-three items are identified in the diet of the round goby; Mytilus galloprovincialis, Setia pulcherrima, Mytilaster lineatus, Lentidium mediterraneum, Idotea balthica, and Alitta (Nereis) succinea dominate in the spring, while in the summer, the diet consists mainly of Sphaeroma pulchellum and L. mediterraneum. The mussels M. galloprovincialis and M. lineatus are important in all seasons.

Reproduction

Female round gobies reach sexual maturity in one to two years while males do so in three to four years. Gobies in the Laurentian Great Lakes typically mature up to one year earlier than in their native habitat in Europe. Females can spawn up to six times during the spawning season, which spans April to September in most areas.

Males will migrate from deeper water, where overwintering occurs, into shallower breeding grounds during the beginning of the mating season. They then release a steroid sex pheromone that attracts females to their territory. Males also use visual displays, including posturing and changing color from beige to black during mating season, and can produce sounds during courtship. The females deposit their eggs in male-guarded crevices between rocks. Males are territorial and will defend eggs from predators as well as continuously fan them to provide the developing embryos with oxygenated water. This results in successful hatch rates of up to 95%.

Invasive species

The species was accidentally introduced into the North American Great Lakes by way of ballast water transfer in cargo ships. First discovered in North America in the St. Clair River in 1990, the round goby is considered an invasive species with significant ecological and economic impact; the consequences of introduction are quite complex as the fish both competes with native species and provides an abundant source of food for them while consuming other invasive species. In other words, the round goby behaves much like most biological invasive controls. An aggressive fish, the round goby outcompetes native species such as the sculpin and logperch for food (such as snails and mussels), shelter, and nesting sites, substantially reducing their numbers. Round gobies are also voracious predators of eggs of native fish, many of them important to the angling industry. The goby's robust ability to survive in degraded environmental conditions has helped to increase its competitive advantage compared to native species.

Many native predatory fish such as smallmouth bass, largemouth bass, walleye, salmon, and trout have begun to prey on round gobies. The incorporation of the round goby into native foodwebs, coupled with the goby's ability to consume large numbers of invasive mussels (zebra and quagga), may result in greater bioaccumulation of toxins such as PCBs higher in the food chain, since these mussels filter-feed and are known to accumulate persistent contaminants. However, this is partly beneficial because even though they do not reduce the population of zebra mussels, they do control their population. Hence, it prevents a large-scale spread of the zebra mussel, which is also an invasive species in the Great Lakes. Another unintended benefit of the round goby's introduction is that the Lake Erie watersnake, once listed as a threatened species, has found the goby to be a tasty addition to its diet. A recent study found the introduced fish now accounts for up to 90% of the snake's diet. The new food supply means that the water snake is now staging a comeback. Round gobies also serve as food for a variety of predatory fishes in the Great Lakes, including bass, lake trout, lake whitefish, burbot, lake sturgeon, and walleye.

The round goby is also considered invasive in parts of Europe. This process was started by its introduction to the Gulf of Gdańsk (southern Baltic Sea) in 1990. Locations recently invaded by round gobies include the Aegean Sea, different parts of the Baltic Sea, the North Sea basin, and the Danube and Rhine basins. In the German part of the Baltic Sea this fish was first noted near Rügen Island. It is now distributed all along the southwestern Baltic Sea coast, including Stettiner Haff (Szczecin Lagoon), the Unterwarnow (Warnow river estuary), the mouth of the Trave, and the Nord-Ostsee (Kiel) Canal.

As of 2010, the westernmost site of round goby occurrence in Europe was the lower Scheldt, including the tidal zone in the river mouth, and Albert Canal, Belgium. In 2011, the round goby began invading the fresh waters of France; the species appeared in the Rhine River (on the border between France and Germany) and in the French part of the Moselle River.

Parasites
In total, fifty-two parasite species are registered in the round goby in its native area. The most abundant parasites of the Black Sea round goby are metacercariae of trematodes of the Heterophyidae family, such as Cryptocotyle concavum, C. lingua, and Pygidiopsis genata. The trematodes C. lingua and P. genata can infest humans. In the 1950s, along the coast of the Gulf of Taganrog (Sea of Azov), the round goby was registered as a host of epizootic nematodes Tetrameres fissispina and Streptocara crassicauda, which were fatal to ducklings.

In the Gulf of Gdańsk, Baltic Sea, the parasites of the invasive round goby consist of twelve species. The core of the parasite fauna comprises two species of trematode metacercariae: C. concavum and Diplostomum spathaceum.  Also in the Baltic Sea, the round goby is a paratenic host of the invasive nematode Anguillicoloides crassus. In the Vistula Lagoon, the most abundant parasites of the round goby are nematodes Hysterothylacium aduncum and Anguillicoloides crassus.

Twenty-five species of parasites are noted in the round goby in the American Great Lakes. The trematode D. spathaceum is the most abundant core species overall, while the cestode Proteocephalus sp. and the trematode Neochasmus umbellus are also well represented. The round goby may prevent some of the metacercariae of N. umbellus from completing their life cycle. The parasite "load" on the invasive gobies in the Great Lakes appears relatively low in comparison with their native habitats, lending support to the "enemy release hypothesis".

References

External links

 Round Goby, an invasive species in the Great Lakes
 Aquatic Invasive Species-Minnesota Sea Grant 
 Global Invasive Species Database
 Harmful Aquatic Hitchhikers
 Minnesota DNR
 InvadingSpecies.com, Ontario Ministry of Natural Resources and Ontario Federation of Anglers and Hunters
 USGS Non-indigenous species
 Species Profile - Round Goby (Neogobius melanostomus), National Invasive Species Information Center, United States National Agricultural Library. Lists general information and resources for Round Goby.
 University of Michigan Museum of Zoology. Animal Diversity Web. Neogobius melanostomus.  Downloaded on 18 May 2009.
 GLANSIS Species Fact Sheet, United States Geological Survey

Fish described in 1814
Fish of the Black Sea
Fish of the Caspian Sea
Fish of Western Asia
Freshwater fish of Asia
Freshwater fish of Europe
Neogobius
Taxa named by Peter Simon Pallas